Brett Mitchell (born July 2, 1979) is an American conductor, composer, and pianist. He began a three-year term as Artistic Director & Conductor of the Sunriver Music Festival in August 2022. He previously served as music director of the Colorado Symphony from 2017 to 2021, Associate Conductor of the Cleveland Orchestra and Music Director of the Cleveland Orchestra Youth Orchestra from 2013 to 2017, Assistant Conductor of the Orchestre National de France from 2006 to 2009, Assistant Conductor of the Houston Symphony from 2007 to 2011, Music Director of the Moores Opera Center in Houston from 2012 to 2013, and Music Director of the Saginaw Bay Symphony Orchestra from 2010 to 2015.

Biography
Born in Seattle, Washington, Mitchell began piano studies at age 6, and studied piano, percussion, and saxophone throughout elementary, middle, and high school. He gave his first public performances as a conductor while at Lynnwood High School in 1995 at the age of 16, leading both orchestra and wind ensemble concerts, and served as music director for his first musical in the spring of 1996 while still a high-school junior.

Mitchell began undergraduate work on a degree in music composition at Western Washington University in the fall of 1997.  During his four years there, he studied composition and conducting with Roger Briggs and piano with Margaret Brink and Jeffrey Gilliam.  As a conductor, he organized many student performances, conducted the school's orchestra, collaborated with faculty in concerto performances, and served as music director for multiple summer stock and other music theater productions. As a composer, Mitchell wrote both concert works and scores for local television and student films.  He won numerous piano scholarships, and was named Presser Scholar and Outstanding Graduating Senior in 2000 and 2001, respectively.

Upon completion of his Bachelor of Music in June 2001, he moved to Austin, Texas, to study orchestral conducting with Kevin Noe at the University of Texas at Austin.  For the next four years, he would serve as Music Director of the University Orchestra and sometime cover conductor for the Austin Symphony.  Mitchell graduated from the University of Texas with a Master of Music in 2003 and a Doctor of Musical Arts in 2005.  His work with Noe led to his employment with the Pittsburgh New Music Ensemble from 2002-06 as their Associate Conductor, where his responsibilities included leading subscription programs, many world and U.S. premieres, numerous multi-media productions, and several recording projects.

In addition to his graduate work, Mitchell also studied  with conductors outside the university, most notably Kurt Masur, with whom he began studies in 2004. In early 2008, Masur selected Mitchell to receive the inaugural Felix Mendelssohn Bartholdy Scholarship, entailing intensive, one-on-one study with Masur, and assisting him with concerts in Europe and America.  Mitchell was also invited to conduct the National Symphony Orchestra and to study with Leonard Slatkin as part of the 2005 National Conducting Institute, and was invited by Slatkin to work with the NSO again in 2006. He studied with Lorin Maazel, David Robertson, Gerard Schwarz, Gunther Schuller, Marin Alsop, Jorma Panula, and Larry Rachleff. Mitchell was the youngest of ten semifinalists from a pool of over 500 applicants in the Third International Conductors' Competition Sir Georg Solti in 2006.

After completing his training, Mitchell accepted a position as Director of Orchestras and Music Director of the opera program at Northern Illinois University from 2005 to 2007.  He led the Philharmonic in six concerts each year, and led his first two opera productions during his tenure: Igor Stravinsky’s The Rake’s Progress and Mark Adamo's Little Women. The Philharmonic was also invited to perform at the Illinois Music Educators Association's All-State Conference for the first time in over a decade in January 2007. His tenure there saw the Philharmonic's first performance of a Gustav Mahler symphony in a dozen years (Symphony No. 1 in April 2006) and their return to the recording studio, recording Sergei Rachmaninoff's Piano Concerto No. 2 in May 2007. Mitchell ended his time at NIU with a week-long festival devoted to the music of Kevin Puts.

While teaching at NIU, Mitchell was invited by his mentor Kurt Masur to audition to become Assistant Conductor of the Orchestre National de France. In February 2006, Mitchell successfully auditioned and was named to the post. During his three-year tenure, he conducted the orchestra and assisted Masur and guest conductors such as Seiji Ozawa and Daniele Gatti at the Théâtre des Champs-Élysées and on tour.

In February 2007, Mitchell was appointed American Conducting Fellow of the Houston Symphony by Hans Graf. In that role, he led the orchestra in several dozen concerts—including on all subscription series—in Jones Hall and throughout the greater Houston area each season. His title was augmented to Assistant Conductor/American Conducting Fellow in June 2008; prior to his final season with the orchestra (2010–11), his title was modified again to Assistant Conductor, reflecting the end of his fellowship with the League of American Orchestras. During his four-year tenure with the Houston Symphony (which ended in May 2011), he led the orchestra in over one hundred performances, several of which were broadcast nationwide on SymphonyCast and Performance Today. Since that time, Mitchell has returned frequently to the Houston Symphony as a guest conductor.

In May 2010, after a two-year search including more than 150 candidates from around the world, Mitchell was appointed the ninth Music Director of Michigan's Saginaw Bay Symphony Orchestra. He took the helm of the orchestra at the outset of its 75th-anniversary season in September 2010, and led the orchestra in its complete series of classical, pops, and education concerts throughout his initial three-year contract and the extension that followed. Mitchell ultimately served as Music Director of the SBSO for five seasons, resigning at the end of 2014-15 season due to increased obligations with the Cleveland Orchestra and various guest conducting responsibilities. During his tenure in Saginaw, he briefly accepted a post as  Music Director of the Moores Opera Center at the Moores School of Music of the University of Houston for the 2012-13 season.

In January 2013, Mitchell was invited by Franz Welser-Möst to become Assistant Conductor of the Cleveland Orchestra, a position he assumed at the beginning of the 2013-14 season. At the conclusion of his initial two-year term, he was promoted to Associate Conductor — a title held by only four previous conductors in the Orchestra's 98-year history and not since Jahja Ling in the 1984-85 season—and his contract was extended for an additional two years through the 2016-17 season. Through his tenure with the Cleveland Orchestra, he concurrently served as Music Director of the Cleveland Orchestra Youth Orchestra, increasing the group's commitment to contemporary repertoire and leading them on a four-city tour of China in June 2015. Mitchell concluded his tenure with both organizations in September 2017.

After making a highly successful debut with the Colorado Symphony in July 2016, Mitchell was named the orchestra's next music director in September 2016. Mitchell held the title of Music Director Designate during the 2016-17 season, and began his four-season tenure as Music Director with the 2017-18 season. During his first two seasons as Music Director, Mitchell collaborated with such celebrated soloists as Yo-Yo Ma, Renée Fleming, Itzhak Perlman, Bela Fleck, and Leslie Odom Jr.

In recent seasons, Mitchell has guest conducted the Cleveland Orchestra, Dallas Symphony Orchestra, Detroit Symphony Orchestra, Grant Park Symphony Orchestra, Houston Symphony, Indianapolis Symphony Orchestra, Milwaukee Symphony Orchestra, Minnesota Orchestra, National Symphony Orchestra, New Zealand Symphony Orchestra, Oregon Symphony, Rochester Philharmonic Orchestra, Saint Paul Chamber Orchestra, San Antonio Symphony, and Vancouver Symphony Orchestra. He will make his debut with the San Francisco Symphony in July 2019  and the Los Angeles Philharmonic at the Hollywood Bowl in September 2019. Recent summer festival appearances include the Grant Park Music Festival, National Repertory Orchestra, Strings Music Festival, Sarasota Music Festival, and Interlochen Center for the Arts. Mitchell regularly collaborates with the world’s leading soloists, including Rudolf Buchbinder, Kirill Gerstein, James Ehnes, Augustin Hadelich, Leila Josefowicz, and Alisa Weilerstein.

He made his European debut in 2004 in a series of three concerts with Romania's Brasov Philharmonic (to which he returned in February 2009), and made his Latin American debut in 2005 with the Orquesta Filarmónica de la UNAM in Mexico City as part of the Eduardo Mata Conducting Competition.

In June 2020, at the height of the COVID-19 pandemic, Mr. Mitchell began recording videos at the piano from his home and releasing them via his YouTube channel. He has since released well over 100 videos at the piano with a particular focus on original arrangements of the works of John Williams, many presented in synchronization with the original, corresponding film clips.

Mitchell is represented worldwide by CM Artists.

References

External links
Official website

1979 births
American male conductors (music)
Living people
University of Texas at Austin alumni
Western Washington University alumni
21st-century American conductors (music)
21st-century American male musicians